A catalog server provides a single point of access that allows users to centrally search for information across a distributed network. In other words, it indexes databases, files and information across large network and allows keywords, Boolean and other searches. If you need to provide a comprehensive searching service for your intranet, extranet or even the Internet, a catalog server is a standard solution.

References

Databases